Mario Ramos (born June 30, 1973 in Salamanca) is a Spanish actor, musician and poet.

Life and career 
Mario Ramos was born in 1973 in Salamanca in Spain and grew up in Germany. He took acting lessons at the theater school Bongôrt van Roy in Bergisch Gladbach. During his training, he played at the Chamber Stage in Bergisch Gladbach in plays like Kiss Me, Kate, Weisman and Rotgesicht or Stella. These roles were followed by productions in Cologne where he played various other roles.

After the study Ramos was active in numerous projects in North Rhine-Westphalia, with several engagements again in Cologne and Bergisch Gladbach. In recent years he played at various local theaters there, such as the Cliff in Cabaret, George Garga in In the Jungle of Cities or the Happy in Arthur Miller's Death of a Salesman.

In the mid-2000s Ramos was seen at the Bad Hersfelder Festspiele in Shakespeare's A Midsummer Night's Dream, in Goethe's Faust or in Camelot. As Mordred in Camelot he got the Hersfeld-Preis in 2005. Since 2009 he played in the Störtebeker Festival on the island of Rügen. In May 2011, Mario Ramos was seen in the Hamburg musical Revolver im Klavier.

In the year 2000 his poems were published in the Martin Werhand Verlag anthology Junge Lyrik II. In 2002 he played his first film role.

Ramos has lived since 2002 with his companion the actress Saskia Fischer in Hamburg, with whom he has a son.

Awards 
 2005: Hersfeld-Preis for his role as Mordred in Camelot

Theater roles (selection)

Filmography (selection) 
 2002: Cafe Schwarz
 2003: Der letzte Vorhang
 2004: Das Maß der Dinge
 2005: Der Lord von Barmbeck (TV Movie)

Literature 
 Junge Lyrik II, Martin Werhand Verlag, Melsbach 2000

External links
 
 
 Mario Ramos im Webauftritt der Komödie Winterhuder Fährhaus
 Interview with actor Mario Ramos  
 Mario Ramos in: Ostsee-Zeitung 
 Portrait of actor Mario Ramos in: Ostsee-Anzeiger: Der Rüganer

References 

1973 births
Living people
20th-century German male actors
21st-century German male actors
People from Salamanca
German male film actors
German male stage actors
German male television actors
German poets
German male poets